Zion Episcopal Church and Rectory is a historic Episcopal church complex located at Colton in St. Lawrence County, New York. The church was built in 1883 of red Potsdam Sandstone. The rectory was built about 1900 and is a two-story, clapboard-sided Italianate building on a sandstone foundation. It is now used as the Colton Town Museum. Also on the property is a cast-iron urn a cast-iron lamppost dating to the 1880s.

It was listed on the National Register of Historic Places in 2003.

References

Churches on the National Register of Historic Places in New York (state)
Episcopal church buildings in New York (state)
Gothic Revival church buildings in New York (state)
Churches completed in 1883
19th-century Episcopal church buildings
Churches in St. Lawrence County, New York
Sandstone churches in the United States
National Register of Historic Places in St. Lawrence County, New York